The 1972 Critérium du Dauphiné Libéré was the 24th edition of the cycle race and was held from 30 May to 4 June 1972. The race started in Chalon-sur-Saône and finished at Avignon. The race was won by Luis Ocaña of the Bic team.

Teams
Ten teams, containing a total of 100 riders, participated in the race:

 
 
 
 
 La Casera–Peña Bahamontes
 Magniflex–de Gribaldy

Route

General classification

References

1972
1972 in French sport
1972 Super Prestige Pernod
May 1972 sports events in Europe
June 1972 sports events in Europe